Juan Jacinto is an Argentinian multi-instrument musician, singer/songwriter, drummer, and percussionist based in London, U.K. actively involved in experimental music combining rhythms, melodies, and harmonies from South America.

Jacinto has written, composed, produced and mixed his debut album Cerca Del Cereal, playing all the instruments in it, with some exceptions. Recorded in 2008, Cerca del Cereal introduced Jacinto to the music scene in Buenos Aires and Latin America. He has played live all around South America and Europe. Jacinto has worked with different artists, such as: Charly García, Axel Krygier, Fernando Samalea, Pablo Dacal, Viajantes, Rosal, Javier Malosetti, Emmanuel Horvilleur, María Teresa Cibils, Qoala, Baltasar Comotto, Alfonso Barbieri, Hernán Jacinto, Paul Ogunsalu, Milton Amadeo, César Isella, Alfonso Barbieri, Daniel Drexler, Déborah de Corral, Leo García and many others. 
Based in London since 2010, has played drums for several artists including Ultimate Painting, James Hoare, Rose Keeler-Schäffeler, Proper Ornaments, Pete Astor, Jack Cooper, Ramiro Nocelli, Yu Sato and more.

Discography 

 1998 - Versos Desnudos, Augusto Larreta - Drums and percussion
 2002 - Qoala, Qoala - Drums, guitar, mix and production
 2003 - Música y delirio, Emmanuel Horvilleur - Percussion
 2003 - Femme, Emme - Drum programming
 2005 - Alvear, Fernando Samalea - Drums
 2005 - Rocanrolero, Emmanuel Horvilleur - Drums on track 6
 2007 - Niño, Javier Malosetti - Recording engineer
 2007 - Rojo, Baltasar Comotto - Drums
 2007 - Su Majestad, Rosal - Japan edition - Bombon Remix
 2008 - Cerca del Cereal, Juan Jacinto - Composition, mix, production
 2009 - Anticipar, María Teresa Cibils - Guitar, Percussion, pre-production
 2009 - La Casa de la Noche, Rosal - Drums
 2010 - Viajantes, Viajantes - Drums
 2011 - Abrigando, María Teresa Cibils - Guitar and drums
 2011 - Un Lugar, Coni Cibils - Drums and percussion
 2011 - Valses eróticos, Alfonso Barbieri - Drums
 2011 - El Progreso, Pablo Dacal - Drums
 2015 - Baila Sobre Fuego, Pablo Dacal - Production, mix and drums
 2015 - Camino, Hernán Jacinto - Percussion on track 5
 2016 - Momia, Avto - Drums on track 3
 2017 - Bosque de Luz, Coni Cibils - Drums
 2017 - 50 años de Rock Nacional, Various Artists - Drums on track 6
 2017 - Sandgrown, Jack Cooper - Drums
 2018 - UP! (Unreleased), Ultimate Painting - Drums
 2018 - Medir el Tiempo, Juan Jacinto - Composition, mix, production
 2019 - With Kindness, Keel Her - Drums and percussion

External links
 Website: juanjacinto.co.uk
 Social: instagram.com/juanjacinto

References 

 Discos Compartidos / Juan Jacinto
 Juan Jacinto - Bio - Rock.com.arl
 Ni blanco ni negro - Cerca de Juan
 Juan Jacinto in City of London
 https://www.discogs.com/artist/5041642-Juan-Jacinto
 * https://www.clubdeldisco.com/resena/745_pablo-dacal_baila-sobre-fuego
 https://www.lanacion.com.ar/espectaculos/conoce-a-viajantes-nid1210145
 https://www.pagina12.com.ar/diario/suplementos/radar/9-5882-2010-01-24.html
 https://www.discogs.com/Keel-Her-With-Kindness/release/13857981
 http://diymag.com/2019/03/29/keel-her-announces-new-album-with-kindness
 http://entremusicas.com/cancionistas-del-rio-de-la-plata

Living people
Argentine musicians
Experimental musicians
1979 births
21st-century Argentine musicians